John William Boden (q1 1882 – 19 March 1946) was an English professional footballer who played in the Football League for Glossop, Clapton Orient and Aston Villa in the 1900s. He appeared in Clapton Orient's first Football League match in 1905. A defender or half back, he later played for Northwich Victoria before moving into the Southern League to play for Reading, Croydon Common, Plymouth Argyle, and New Brompton. Boden died in his native Northwich, Cheshire, in 1946 aged about 64.

References

1882 births
1946 deaths
Sportspeople from Northwich
English footballers
Association football defenders
Glossop North End A.F.C. players
Leyton Orient F.C. players
Aston Villa F.C. players
Northwich Victoria F.C. players
Reading F.C. players
Croydon Common F.C. players
Plymouth Argyle F.C. players
Gillingham F.C. players
English Football League players
Southern Football League players